Kazanlı can refer to:

 Kazanlı
 Kazanlı, Cide
 Kazanlı, Eğil
 Kazanlı, Suluova